Hazelton Township is a township in Aitkin County, Minnesota, United States. The population was 844 as of the 2010 census.

History
Hazelton Township was named for early county commissioner Cutler J. Hazelton.

Geography
Most of the township's extensive water area is within Mille Lacs Lake, the second-largest inland lake in Minnesota.

Major highways
  U.S. Highway 169
  Minnesota State Highway 18

Lakes
 Big Pine Lake
 Birch Lake
 Bobseen Lake
 Camp Lake
 Constance Lake
 Cranberry Lake
 Farm Island Lake (south quarter)
 Gregg Lake
 Horseshoe Lake
 Jacobs Lake
 Johnson Lake
 Kelly Lake
 Laurel Lake
 Little Spruce Lake
 Mallard Lake
 Mille Lacs Lake (west half)
 Petes Lakes
 Round Lake
 Sanders Lake
 Spectacle Lake
 Spruce Lake
 Tame Fish Lake
 Taylor Lake
 Thirteen Lake

Adjacent townships
 Farm Island Township (north)
 Nordland Township (northeast)
 Wealthwood Township (east)
 South Harbor Township, Mille Lacs County (southeast)
 Kathio Township, Mille Lacs County (south)
 Bay Lake Township, Crow Wing County (west)
 Garrison Township, Crow Wing County (west)
 Deerwood Township, Crow Wing County (northwest)

Cemeteries
The township contains Bennettville Cemetery.

Demographics
As of the census of 2000, there were 712 people, 345 households, and 233 families residing in the township. The population density was 25.3 people per square mile (9.8/km2). The racial makeup of the township was 96.21% White, 0.56% African American, 2.53% Native American, 0.14% from other races, and 0.56% from two or more races. Hispanic or Latino of any race were 0.14% of the population.

There were 345 households, out of which 15.9% had children under the age of 18 living with them, 59.1% were married couples living together, 6.7% had a female householder with no husband present, and 32.2% were non-families. 28.7% of all households were made up of individuals, and 15.9% had someone living alone who was 65 years of age or older. The average household size was 2.06 and the average family size was 2.44.

In the township the population was spread out, with 13.9% under the age of 18, 4.4% from 18 to 24, 18.0% from 25 to 44, 34.7% from 45 to 64, and 29.1% who were 65 years of age or older. The median age was 54 years. For every 100 females, there were 116.4 males. For every 100 females age 18 and over, there were 111.4 males.

The median income for a household in the township was $33,056, and the median income for a family was $35,577. Males had a median income of $35,263 versus $28,750 for females. The per capita income for the township was $20,731. About 6.3% of families and 10.4% of the population were below the poverty line, including 19.8% of those under age 18 and 4.0% of those age 65 or over.

References
 United States National Atlas
 United States Census Bureau 2007 TIGER/Line Shapefiles
 United States Board on Geographic Names (GNIS)

Townships in Aitkin County, Minnesota
Townships in Minnesota